Nathan William Hodel (born November 12, 1977) is a former American football long snapper. He was signed by the Carolina Panthers as an undrafted free agent in 2001. He played college football at Illinois.

Hodel was also a member of the Arizona Cardinals, New England Patriots and Detroit Lions.

Early years
Hodel attended Belleville East High School in Belleville, Illinois, and was a two-sport star in baseball and football. In football, he was the team captain and an All-Conference pick as an offensive lineman.  In baseball, he was a pitcher, the team captain, an All-Conference pitcher, and an all-Illinois prep pitcher.

College career
At the University of Illinois, Hodel was a long snapper on the football team and a pitcher on the baseball team.

Professional career

Carolina Panthers
After graduating from college in 2001, Hodel spent six games on the practice squad with the Carolina Panthers and was then released.

Arizona Cardinals
Hodel signed with the Arizona Cardinals shortly after his release by the Panthers and spent the next nine games on their practice squad. He was activated to the Cardinals' 53-man roster for the last two games of the 2001 season but did not enter a game. He handled long snapping duties with the Cardinals from 2002 to 2008.

Hodel was released by the Cardinals on February 26, 2009.

New England Patriots
Hodel was signed by the New England Patriots on March 10, 2009 after the team's previous long snapper, Lonie Paxton, signed with the Denver Broncos.

Detroit Lions
Hodel signed with the Detroit Lions on December 17, 2009 after an injury to Lions long snapper Don Muhlbach. The Lions waived Hodel on December 24.

Hodel retired after the 2009 season and now lives with his family in Wauconda, Illinois. Hodel is married to Kimberly, has a daughter, Riley, and a son, Miller. 

He finished his NFL career playing in 133 games. He is fifth in Arizona Cardinals history in consecutive games played at 132.

External links
New England Patriots bio

1977 births
Living people
Sportspeople from Belleville, Illinois
Players of American football from Illinois
American football long snappers
Illinois Fighting Illini baseball players
Illinois Fighting Illini football players
Carolina Panthers players
Arizona Cardinals players
New England Patriots players
Detroit Lions players